Tidiani Tall, also commonly referred to as Jeff Tall (born May 25, 1969 in Bamako, Mali) is the author of Fixing Africa: Once and for All and is an African business leader, public speaker and entrepreneur.

Personal
Tall grew up in Bamako, Mali, from birth to age 7 when his father, Maki Tall, became Ambassador of Mali to Saudi Arabia. At this time Tidiani (Jeff) Tall was sent to boarding school in France. Shortly thereafter the Tall family moved to Washington, DC and Tidiani studied at the French International School in Bethesda, Maryland. It is here that he gained a taste for American football and has since been a Washington Redskins fan. His time in the United States saw Tall meet Jimmy Carter and attend events such as Ronald Reagan's annual Christmas party before the age of 12.

In 1982, the Tall family moved back to Mali where Tidiani studied in Bamako at the French International School and subsequently, in 1985, attended the Prytanée National Militaire cadet school in La Flèche, department of La Sarthe, France. In 1990, Tall was admitted to the elite Ecole Polytechnique of Paris where he stayed for three years before studying for one year at the French Petroleum Institute, also in Paris.

Tall now holds a Masters in Economics & Management from the French Petroleum Institute in Paris, France and a Masters in Engineering in Applied Mathematics from Ecole Polytechnique also in Paris, France. From this upbringing Tall began a professional career as described below.

Tall currently travels the world but splits the majority of his time between Paris, France, and Addis Ababa, Ethiopia.

Professional

In 1994, Tidiani (Jeff) Tall was hired to join the Analyst program in the Fixed Income division at Morgan Stanley in London as 1 of 10 high potential graduates from across Europe. After 18 months at Morgan Stanley, driven by a desire to contribute to his native home of Mali through entrepreneurial endeavours, Tall returned to Mali to create and run a road transport company in the landlocked nation. Timbuktu Trading & Transport ("3T") became the first trucking company in Mali that met international standards in safety and employment practices.

Subsequent to running 3T for three years, Tall moved on to found a dotcom startup based in New York City called eSpirituality. The website became the first major portal for personal development and alternative medicine and won acclaim from New Age magazine, was named a Yahoo site of the day and was featured on MSN. Of memorable note was an interactive dream analysis section held by the resident "Dr. Dream". At the end of 2000, eSpirituality became a casualty of the dot-com bubble.

In January 2001, Tall began another extended foray into professional services first by joining Roland Berger Strategy Consultants, a top European strategy consulting firm, to work in their Paris and New York offices as a Senior Consultant. Two years later Tall left to co-found a New York-based consulting boutique called Expansion USA. Expansion USA developed a reputation by assisting European companies and institutions establish or expand their presence in the united States marketplace. Four years henceforth Tall moved to Dubai in the United Arab Emirates and created a marketing and communications agency called A+ Marketing.

His experience to this point had seen Tall work with large international organizations including ExxonMobil, Total, Shell, MasterCard, Lycos and Daimler Chrysler among many others operating in all corners of the globe.

In April 2010, Tall joined Lafarge, a global leader in building materials, as Vice President Supply Chain & Distribution, Sub-Saharan Africa where he works to develop the commercial capabilities of ten business units in ten countries.

Tall is also a member of the African Leadership Network and of Africa 2.0.

Family History
Tall is the great-great grandson of West African Emperor Umar Tall and the great grandson of West African King Agibu Tall. Stretching across much of what is now Senegal, Guinea and Mali, they were leaders of the Tukulor empire in the nineteenth century.

Tall's father, Maki Tall, served as the Ambassador of Mali to Saudi Arabia and subsequently as the Ambassador to the United States which required moving his family to Washington, DC. This post afforded Tidiani (Jeff) Tall, at a young age, the opportunity to meet President Jimmy Carter and attend White House events such as Ronald and Nancy Reagan's annual Christmas party to which his father and family were invited. Moving back to Mali, Maki Tall became the Director of International Cooperation at the ministry of Foreign Affairs in Bamako. He later served as Ambassador of Mali to Germany and to the United Arab Emirates. Maki Tall is currently the traditional ruler of Bandiagara in Mali.

Fixing Africa: Once and for all
Fixing Africa: Once and for all is a progressive work focused on improving Africa and moving it forward from the hardships that have plagued the continent's past. A child of Pan-Africanism, the premise surrounds a conglomeration of Africa's 54 countries currently represented into 3 "Super Federations" by the year 2030. The published book and E-book delve into failed movements of the past and the factors that prevented them from becoming realities, influential examples of successful movements outside of Africa, the need for understanding and knowledge coupled with a willingness for real and practical change along with several pragmatic examples of what this change might look like.

As Tall describes the hope for change lies within and must be "led by the youth and enabled by [effective use of] information technology."

Fixing Africa: Once and for All is available in print or as an E-book and has been made available in English, French, Arabic and Chinese.

Inspiration
Tall's inspiration for Fixing Africa came from the hypocrisy of 2007-2010's 50th anniversary celebration of Independence in many African nations. Multimillion-dollar celebrations were occurring despite decades of lost progress and a population largely living in misery and humiliation. Tall's goal is to inform a new generation of Africans and set high expectations within them to ensure that, "with the ascension of a new breed of leaders might Africa’s people be delivered out of poverty, diseases, wars, famine, economic meltdown, political paralysis, and 360-degree insecurity."

Key Messages
Summarized, Fixing Africa is based on three ideals:
 All 54 African countries are struggling. The denial must end so the recovery can start.
 Individually African men and women have shown that they can perform at a global level in any field, anytime and anywhere.
 New ideas and bold actions are required to translate individual achievements into collective progress.

Alternative Viewpoints
Dambisa Moyo, author and economist, discusses the counterintuitive negative impact associated with African Aid in the book Dead Aid. Moyo "describes the state of postwar development policy in Africa today and unflinchingly confronts one of the greatest myths of our time: that billions of dollars in aid sent from wealthy countries to developing African nations has helped to reduce poverty and increase growth."

Martin Meredith, historian and journalist, provides a controversial Western viewpoint on fifty years of African independence, and the many failures that have accompanied it, in the book The Fate of Africa: A History of Fifty Years of Independence.

References

External links

 Official Website
 E-book downloads available in English, French, Arabic & Chinese
 NEXT author Ayo Okulaja interviews Tidiani (Jeff) Tall
 African Strategist & Author Proposes a Bold approach to Fixing Africa
 Foresight for Development E-book Download
 Interview regarding the viral ascension of Fixing Africa and its overall value to Africa's Future
 Chez Gangoueus Interview with Tidiani (Jeff) Tall (French)
 African Dream Magazine Article Featuring Fixing Africa
 Afronline: The Voice of Africa Discussion on the Fixing Africa Project
 BBC Afrique.com Feature (French)
 Les Afriques feature on Tidiane Tall and Fixing Africa (French)
 JournalduMali.com Article (French)
 Terangaweb Entrepreneurial Feature on Tidiane Tall (French)

1969 births
Living people